Shilovo is the name of several inhabited localities in Russia.

Modern localities

Altai Krai
As of 2010, one rural locality in Altai Krai bears this name:
Shilovo, Altai Krai, a selo in Shilovsky Selsoviet of Kalmansky District

Arkhangelsk Oblast
As of 2010, one rural locality in Arkhangelsk Oblast bears this name:
Shilovo, Arkhangelsk Oblast, a village under the administrative jurisdiction of Privodino Urban-Type Settlement with Jurisdictional Territory, Kotlassky District

Ivanovo Oblast
As of 2010, two rural localities in Ivanovo Oblast bear this name:
Shilovo, Kineshemsky District, Ivanovo Oblast, a village in Kineshemsky District
Shilovo, Privolzhsky District, Ivanovo Oblast, a village in Privolzhsky District

Kaliningrad Oblast
As of 2010, one rural locality in Kaliningrad Oblast bears this name:
Shilovo, Kaliningrad Oblast, a settlement in Gavrilovsky Rural Okrug of Ozyorsky District

Kaluga Oblast
As of 2010, one rural locality in Kaluga Oblast bears this name:
Shilovo, Kaluga Oblast, a village in Borovsky District

Kostroma Oblast
As of 2010, one rural locality in Kostroma Oblast bears this name:
Shilovo, Kostroma Oblast, a village in Ugorskoye Settlement of Manturovsky District

Moscow Oblast
As of 2010, four rural localities in Moscow Oblast bear this name:
Shilovo, Lotoshinsky District, Moscow Oblast, a village in Osheykinskoye Rural Settlement of Lotoshinsky District
Shilovo, Ramensky District, Moscow Oblast, a village in Sofyinskoye Rural Settlement of Ramensky District
Shilovo, Ruzsky District, Moscow Oblast, a village in Volkovskoye Rural Settlement of Ruzsky District
Shilovo, Volokolamsky District, Moscow Oblast, a village in Yaropoletskoye Rural Settlement of Volokolamsky District

Nizhny Novgorod Oblast
As of 2010, one rural locality in Nizhny Novgorod Oblast bears this name:
Shilovo, Nizhny Novgorod Oblast, a village in Khvoshchevsky Selsoviet of Bogorodsky District

Novgorod Oblast
As of 2010, two rural localities in Novgorod Oblast bear this name:
Shilovo, Khvoyninsky District, Novgorod Oblast, a village in Borovskoye Settlement of Khvoyninsky District
Shilovo, Valdaysky District, Novgorod Oblast, a village in Yazhelbitskoye Settlement of Valdaysky District

Novosibirsk Oblast
As of 2010, one rural locality in Novosibirsk Oblast bears this name:
Shilovo, Novosibirsk Oblast, a selo in Novosibirsky District

Oryol Oblast
As of 2010, one rural locality in Oryol Oblast bears this name:
Shilovo, Oryol Oblast, a village in Krutovskoy Selsoviet of Livensky District

Perm Krai
As of 2010, one rural locality in Perm Krai bears this name:
Shilovo, Perm Krai, a village in Permsky District

Pskov Oblast
As of 2010, twelve rural localities in Pskov Oblast bear this name:
Shilovo (Bezhanitskaya Rural Settlement), Bezhanitsky District, Pskov Oblast, a village in Bezhanitsky District; municipally, a part of Bezhanitskaya Rural Settlement of that district
Shilovo (Dobryvichskaya Rural Settlement), Bezhanitsky District, Pskov Oblast, a village in Bezhanitsky District; municipally, a part of Dobryvichskaya Rural Settlement of that district
Shilovo, Dedovichsky District, Pskov Oblast, a village in Dedovichsky District
Shilovo, Krasnogorodsky District, Pskov Oblast, a village in Krasnogorodsky District
Shilovo, Novorzhevsky District, Pskov Oblast, a village in Novorzhevsky District
Shilovo, Ostrovsky District, Pskov Oblast, a village in Ostrovsky District
Shilovo, Pechorsky District, Pskov Oblast, a village in Pechorsky District
Shilovo, Porkhovsky District, Pskov Oblast, a village in Porkhovsky District
Shilovo, Pskovsky District, Pskov Oblast, a village in Pskovsky District
Shilovo, Pushkinogorsky District, Pskov Oblast, a village in Pushkinogorsky District
Shilovo, Pustoshkinsky District, Pskov Oblast, a village in Pustoshkinsky District
Shilovo, Velikoluksky District, Pskov Oblast, a village in Velikoluksky District

Ryazan Oblast
As of 2010, two inhabited localities in Ryazan Oblast bear this name.

Urban localities
Shilovo, Shilovsky District, Ryazan Oblast, a work settlement in Shilovsky District

Rural localities
Shilovo, Korablinsky District, Ryazan Oblast, a village in Yurakovsky Rural Okrug of Korablinsky District

Smolensk Oblast
As of 2010, four rural localities in Smolensk Oblast bear this name:
Shilovo, Gagarinsky District, Smolensk Oblast, a village in Ashkovskoye Rural Settlement of Gagarinsky District
Shilovo, Glinkovsky District, Smolensk Oblast, a village in Dobrominskoye Rural Settlement of Glinkovsky District
Shilovo, Rudnyansky District, Smolensk Oblast, a village in Lyubavichskoye Rural Settlement of Rudnyansky District
Shilovo, Ugransky District, Smolensk Oblast, a village in Kholmovskoye Rural Settlement of Ugransky District

Tambov Oblast
As of 2010, one rural locality in Tambov Oblast bears this name:
Shilovo, Tambov Oblast, a selo in Grazhdanovsky Selsoviet of Bondarsky District

Tula Oblast
As of 2010, two rural localities in Tula Oblast bear this name:
Shilovo, Venyovsky District, Tula Oblast, a village in Kukuysky Rural Okrug of Venyovsky District
Shilovo, Yefremovsky District, Tula Oblast, a selo in Shilovsky Rural Okrug of Yefremovsky District

Tver Oblast
As of 2010, four rural localities in Tver Oblast bear this name:
Shilovo, Andreapolsky District, Tver Oblast, a village in Lugovskoye Rural Settlement of Andreapolsky District
Shilovo, Kalininsky District, Tver Oblast, a village in Verkhnevolzhskoye Rural Settlement of Kalininsky District
Shilovo, Staritsky District, Tver Oblast, a village in Stepurinskoye Rural Settlement of Staritsky District
Shilovo, Vyshnevolotsky District, Tver Oblast, a settlement in Kolomenskoye Rural Settlement of Vyshnevolotsky District

Vologda Oblast
As of 2010, nine rural localities in Vologda Oblast bear this name:
Shilovo, Babayevsky District, Vologda Oblast, a village in Tsentralny Selsoviet of Babayevsky District
Shilovo, Babushkinsky District, Vologda Oblast, a village in Kulibarovsky Selsoviet of Babushkinsky District
Shilovo, Cherepovetsky District, Vologda Oblast, a village in Myaksinsky Selsoviet of Cherepovetsky District
Shilovo, Gryazovetsky District, Vologda Oblast, a village in Sidorovsky Selsoviet of Gryazovetsky District
Shilovo, Kichmengsko-Gorodetsky District, Vologda Oblast, a village in Yemelyanovsky Selsoviet of Kichmengsko-Gorodetsky District
Shilovo, Nikolsky District, Vologda Oblast, a village in Milofanovsky Selsoviet of Nikolsky District
Shilovo, Ust-Kubinsky District, Vologda Oblast, a village in Ustyansky Selsoviet of Ust-Kubinsky District
Shilovo, Ustyuzhensky District, Vologda Oblast, a village in Ustyuzhensky Selsoviet of Ustyuzhensky District
Shilovo, Vologodsky District, Vologda Oblast, a village in Borisovsky Selsoviet of Vologodsky District

Yaroslavl Oblast
As of 2010, three rural localities in Yaroslavl Oblast bear this name:
Shilovo, Danilovsky District, Yaroslavl Oblast, a village in Pokrovsky Rural Okrug of Danilovsky District
Shilovo, Nekrasovsky District, Yaroslavl Oblast, a village in Vyatsky Rural Okrug of Nekrasovsky District
Shilovo, Rybinsky District, Yaroslavl Oblast, a village in Pogorelsky Rural Okrug of Rybinsky District

Abolished localities
Shilovo, Voronezh Oblast, formerly a work settlement under the administrative jurisdiction of Voronezh Urban Okrug; merged into Voronezh in January 2011